Abdelkebir Ouaddar (born 15 July 1962) is a Moroccan equestrian. He competed at the 2016 Summer Olympics in the individual jumping event, in which he tied for 50th place. He was the flag bearer for Morocco at the Parade of Nations.

Ouaddar also participated at the 2014 World Equestrian Games in Normandy, France, where he placed 13th individually and 27th teamwise.

He competed at the 2020 Summer Olympics.

References

External links
 
 
 
 

1962 births
Living people
Moroccan male equestrians
Olympic equestrians of Morocco
Equestrians at the 2016 Summer Olympics
Competitors at the 2019 African Games
African Games silver medalists for Morocco
African Games medalists in equestrian
Equestrians at the 2020 Summer Olympics
20th-century Moroccan people
21st-century Moroccan people